Daqiao is a town of Nanbu County in northeastern Sichuan province, China, located  west of the county seat. , it has one residential community and 15 villages under its administration.

See also 
 List of township-level divisions of Sichuan

References 

Towns in Sichuan
Nanbu County